The 2015 Fairfield Challenger was a professional tennis tournament played on hard courts. It was the first edition of the tournament which was part of the 2015 ATP Challenger Tour. It took place in Fairfield, California, United States between 12 and 18 October 2015.

Singles main-draw entrants

Seeds

 1 Rankings are as of October 5, 2015.

Other entrants
The following players received wildcards into the singles main draw:
  Connor Hance
  Marcos Giron
  Sem Verbeek
  Tommy Paul

The following player received entry using a special exemption:
  Taylor Fritz

The following players received entry into the singles main draw as alternates:
  Frederik Nielsen
  Marek Michalička

The following players received entry from the qualifying draw:
  Henri Laaksonen
  Sekou Bangoura
  Alex Kuznetsov
  Peter Polansky

Champions

Singles

  Taylor Fritz def.  Dustin Brown, 6–3, 6–4.

Doubles

  Johan Brunström /  Frederik Nielsen def.  Carsten Ball /  Dustin Brown, 6–3, 5–7, [10–5].

References

Fairfield Challenger
Fairfield Challenger